The English Bridge is a masonry arch viaduct, crossing the River Severn in Shrewsbury, Shropshire. The present bridge is a 1926 rebuilding and widening (re-using the original masonry) of John Gwynn's design, completed in 1774. A bridge is known to have stood at this spot since at least Norman times. Historically, it was known as the "Stone Bridge". It is a Grade II* listed building.

The original Norman bridge consisted of five arches and a timber causeway. A large tower stood on the East bank, housing a gate and a drawbridge. The bridge also supported several shops and houses. This bridge cost £16,000. The  span central arch was built high, to provide headroom to watercraft, but this resulted in steep approaches.

As a result, a new design was put forward in 1921 by Arthur W. Ward, the Borough Surveyor. It cost £86,000 and was formally opened on 26 October 1927 by Queen Mary, although it had been completed the previous year. Ward's bridge reused the old masonry, each stone carefully numbered, as well as a quantity of new stonework. Concrete was used to 'saddle' the arches and in the foundations.

The bridge is one of two bridges carrying the main east-west route over the Severn as it loops around Shrewsbury; the Welsh Bridge is its counterpart on the other side of the town. Despite the names, both bridges are in England, but the Welsh Bridge is on the side closer to Wales.

Thomas Telford's Holyhead Road, dating from 1815 and connecting London to the main sea-crossing to Ireland, used the English Bridge to cross the Severn here. The road's modern successor, the A5, now bypasses Shrewsbury and the bridge's main role today is to connect the centre of Shrewsbury with the Belle Vue and Abbey Foregate areas of the town.

Gallery

See also 
Welsh Bridge - the "sister" bridge on the other side of the town centre
Crossings of the River Severn

References 

Blackwall, Anthony, Historic Bridges of Shropshire, Shropshire Libraries, 1985, 
Cragg, R., Civil Engineering Heritage - Wales & West Central England, Thomas Telford Publishing, 2nd edn., 1997, 
Listed status

Bridges in Shrewsbury
Bridges completed in 1926
Bridges across the River Severn
Grade II* listed buildings in Shropshire
Bridges completed in 1774
1926 establishments in England
Arch bridges in the United Kingdom
Grade II* listed bridges in England